John Thompson, 1st Baron Haversham (c. 1648 – 1 November 1710), known as Sir John Thompson, Bt, between 1673 and 1696, was an English politician.

Thompson was the son of Maurice Thomson (1601/4-1676), of St Andrew, Eastcheap, City of London and Haversham, "England's greatest colonial merchant of his day", who at one time obtained a monopoly of the Virginia tobacco trade. His mother was Dorothy Vaux, daughter of John Vaux, of Pembrokeshire. He was High Sheriff of Buckinghamshire between 1669 and 1670 and was created a Baronet, of Haversham in the County of Buckingham, in 1673. In 1685 he was returned to Parliament for Gatton, a seat he held until 1696, when he was raised to the peerage as Baron Haversham, of Haversham in the County of Buckingham. Between 1699 and 1701 he was a Lord of the Admiralty.

Lord Haversham married firstly Lady Frances Annesley, daughter of Arthur Annesley, 1st Earl of Anglesey, and widow of Francis Wyndham, in 1688. They had at least eleven children. After her death in March 1705 he married secondly Martha Graham, a widow, in 1709. There were no children from this marriage. Lord Haversham died at Richmond in November 1710 and was succeeded in his titles by his son, Maurice. Lady Haversham died in 1724.

References

	

Year of birth uncertain
1710 deaths
Barons Haversham
Peers of England created by William III
High Sheriffs of Buckinghamshire
Lords of the Admiralty
English MPs 1685–1687
English MPs 1689–1690
English MPs 1690–1695
English MPs 1695–1698